Alessandro Roncaglia (1947) is an Italian economist. He was professor of economics at the Sapienza University of Rome from 1981 to 2017.

Awards and honors 
In 2002 the Italian edition of his The wealth of ideas, later published in an expanded edition in English, has won the Jerome Blanqui Award of the European Society for the History of Economic Thought.

In 2018 appeared Classical Economics Today: Essays in Honor of Alessandro Roncaglia, edited by Marcella Corsi, J.A. Kregel and Carlo D'Ippoliti.

Bibliography 
Among the publications of Alessandro Roncaglia are:
  ;translated in Spanish as:;translated in English as:

 

  (several reprints)

References 

1947 births
Living people
Italian economists
Post-Keynesian economists